Gemmula hawleyi is a species of sea snail, a marine gastropod mollusk in the family Turridae, the turrids.

Distribution
This marine species is endemic to Australia and occurs off New South Wales.

References

 Iredale, T. 1931. Australian molluscan notes. No. 1. Records of the Australian Museum 18(4): 201–235, pls xxii–xxv
 Laseron, C. 1954. Revision of the New South Wales Turridae (Mollusca). Australian Zoological Handbook. Sydney : Royal Zoological Society of New South Wales pp. 56, pls 1–12.
 Powell, A.W.B. 1964. The Family Turridae in the Indo-Pacific. Part 1. The Subfamily Turrinae. Indo-Pacific Mollusca 1: 227-346 
 Powell, A.W.B. 1966. The molluscan families Speightiidae and Turridae, an evaluation of the valid taxa, both Recent and fossil, with list of characteristic species. Bulletin of the Auckland Institute and Museum. Auckland, New Zealand 5: 1–184, pls 1–23 
 Powell, A.W.B. 1968. The turrid shellfish of Australian waters. Australian Natural History 1 16: 1–6 
 Wilson, B. 1994. Australian marine shells. Prosobranch gastropods. Kallaroo, WA : Odyssey Publishing Vol. 2 370 pp.

External links
 Biolib.cz: Gemmula hawleyi
  Tucker, J.K. 2004 Catalog of recent and fossil turrids (Mollusca: Gastropoda). Zootaxa 682:1-1295.

hawleyi
Gastropods described in 1931